South Page Community School District, or South Page Schools, is a small, rural, public school district headquartered in College Springs, Iowa.

It is entirely in Page County, and includes College Springs, Blanchard, Braddyville, Coin, and Shambaugh.

History
It was formed in 1959 by combining the Braddyville, Coin, Amity (College Springs), and Blanchard consolidated districts which included Shambaugh. Although the elementary and grades 7–12 are housed in College Springs, at one time there were two elementary schools located in Braddyville and Coin.  The high school has always been located in College Springs.  The 1960 K–12 enrollment was approximately 600 but enrollment has plummeted to less than 200 students.  Although some of the sharp decline is due to an open enrollment policy in Iowa, the great majority is due to population shift in rural areas as a result of smaller families, larger farms and lack of economic opportunity.

Schools
The district operates two schools on one campus in College Springs:
South Page Elementary School
South Page Senior High School

South Page High School

Athletics
The Rebels  competed  in the Corner Conference until the end of the 2018-19 school year.

South Page now co-ops sports with Clarinda as the "Clarinda Cardinals". They compete in the following sports:

Cross Country (boys and girls)
Volleyball
Football
Basketball (boys and girls)
Wrestling
Track and Field (boys and girls)
Golf (boys and girls)
Baseball
Softball
Bowling

Notable alumni
Joe Henderson, a former state champion miler and now a leading author on running.
Norman Johnston, one of America's top decathletes in the 1960s.
Kevin Wise, a 2x state champion long jumper, all-state football player, and a member of the KMA Sports Hall of Fame.

See also
List of school districts in Iowa
List of high schools in Iowa

References

External links
 South Page Community School District
 

Education in Page County, Iowa
School districts established in 1959
School districts in Iowa
1959 establishments in Iowa